Carlos Gussenhoven (born 19 July 1946, Amsterdam) is a professor of linguistics at Radboud University Nijmegen. He specializes in phonetics and phonology.

Books
 Carlos Gussenhoven, On the Grammar and Semantics of Sentence Accents (Publications in Language Sciences),  Walter de Gruyter & Co,  1984, 
 Carlos Gussenhoven & Natasha Warner, editors, Laboratory Phonology VII, Mouton de Gruyter, 2002, 
 Carlos Gussenhoven, The Phonology of Tone and Intonation (Research Surveys in Linguistics), Cambridge University Press, 2004, 
 Tomas Riad & Carlos Gussenhoven, Tones and Tunes: Typological Studies in Word and Sentence Prosody (Phonology and Phonetics), Mouton de Gruyter, 2007, 
 Carlos Gussenhoven & Tomas Riad, Tones and Tunes: Experimental Studies in Word and Sentence Prosody (Phonology and Phonetics), Mouton de Gruyter, 2007, 
 Carlos Gussenhoven & Haike Jacobs, Understanding Phonology (Understanding Language), Hodder Education Publishers, 4th edition, 2017,

Sources
 Books by Gussenhoven
 About Gussenhoven
 Publications

1946 births
Living people
Linguists from the Netherlands
Phonologists
Scientists from Amsterdam
University of Amsterdam alumni
Academic staff of Radboud University Nijmegen
Academics of Queen Mary University of London
Phoneticians